Puszcza Biała (White Wilderness) is the name given to the forest that extends in Poland from Pułtusk to Ostrów Mazowiecka. It is part of the Mazovian lowlands and consists of small trees, mostly pine.

The White Wilderness (Puszcza Biała) is usually associated with the Green Wilderness (Puszcza Zielona), and together the two forests are often referred to as the Kurpie Forest (Puszcza Kurpiowska) because the two forests were populated by inhabitants who, over the centuries of isolation, developed a unique culture of their own, called Kurpie.

Settlements in the Puszcza Biała
 Pułtusk
 Pniewo
 Tocznabiel
 Ostrów Mazowiecka
 Wyszków
 Brok
 Długosiodło
 Brańszczyk
 Obryte
 Rząśnik
 Nowy Lubiel
 Popowo-Letnisko

Rivers running through the Puszcza Biała 
 Bug
 Narew
 Brok
 Zgorza Struga

Nature preserves within the Puszcza Biała 

 Rezerwat przyrody Stawinoga
 Rezerwat przyrody Popławy
 Rezerwat przyrody Bartnia
 Rezerwat przyrody Wielgolas

See also 

 Polish forests
 Puszcza Kurpiowska
 Puszcza Zielona
 Kurpie

References 
 —Polish Wikipedia: Puszcza Biała
 —Nature Poland.pl: Puszcza Biała
 —Lasy Państwe: Puszcza Biała
 —Centrum folklorystyczne Puszczy Białej: Kuźnia Kurpiowska w Pniewie

Forests of Poland
Geography of Masovian Voivodeship
Parks in Masovian Voivodeship
Natura 2000 in Poland